The list of Roman hoards in Britain comprises significant archaeological hoards of coins, jewellery, precious and scrap metal objects and other valuable items discovered in Great Britain (England, Scotland and Wales) that are associated with period of Romano-British culture when Southern Britain was under the control of the Roman Empire, from AD 43 until about 410, as well as the subsequent Sub-Roman period up to the establishment of Anglo-Saxon kingdoms.  It includes both hoards that were buried with the intention of retrieval at a later date (personal hoards, founder's hoards, merchant's hoards, and hoards of loot), and also hoards of votive offerings which were not intended to be recovered at a later date, but excludes grave goods and single items found in isolation.

Most Roman hoards are composed largely or entirely of coins, and are relatively common in Britain, with over 1,200 known examples.  A smaller number of hoards, such as the Mildenhall Treasure and the Hoxne Hoard, include items of silver or gold tableware such as dishes, bowls, jugs and spoons, or items of silver or gold jewellery.

List of hoards

See also

 List of hoards in Britain
 List of Bronze Age hoards in Britain
 List of Iron Age hoards in Britain

Notes

Footnotes

References
 
 
 
 
 
 
 
 
 
 
 

Archaeology-related lists
Hoards
Treasure troves
Lists of hoards in Britain